Elis Sandin (October 31, 1901, Boteå, Ångermanland – July 15, 1987) was a Swedish cross-country skier who competed in the 1924 Winter Olympics.

In 1924 he finished eighth in the 18 km event.

Cross-country skiing results

Olympic Games

External links
 Cross-country skiing 1924 

1901 births
1987 deaths
People from Sollefteå Municipality
Cross-country skiers from Västernorrland County
Swedish male cross-country skiers
Olympic cross-country skiers of Sweden
Cross-country skiers at the 1924 Winter Olympics